The men's super heavyweight (over 91 kg/200.2 lbs) K-1 category at the W.A.K.O. World Championships 2007 in Belgrade was the heaviest of the K-1 tournaments, involving thirteen fighters from two continents (Europe and South America).  Each of the matches was three rounds of two minutes each and were fought under K-1 rules.

Due to the shortage of fighters required for a sixteen-man tournament, three men had byes through to the quarter finals.  The tournament winner was Belarus's Aliaksei Kudzin who defeated the Russian Dzhamal Kasumov in the final to win gold.  Defeated semi finalists Mirko Vlahovic from Montenegro and Mladen Bozic from Serbia won bronze medals.

Results

See also
List of WAKO Amateur World Championships
List of WAKO Amateur European Championships
List of male kickboxers

References

External links
 WAKO World Association of Kickboxing Organizations Official Site

Kickboxing events at the WAKO World Championships 2007 Belgrade
2007 in kickboxing
Kickboxing in Serbia